Arthur (Artturi) August Aalto (originally Silfver; May 2, 1876 Karjalohja – April 25, 1937 Tuusula) was a Finnish Social Democratic politician and journalist. He  was elected to the Parliament of Finland in 1919 election from Uusimaa Province and continued as MP until 1933. Aalto was a member of the electoral college for selecting the President of Finland in 1925 and 1931.

References
 

1876 births
1937 deaths
People from Lohja
People from Uusimaa Province (Grand Duchy of Finland)
Social Democratic Party of Finland politicians
Members of the Parliament of Finland (1919–22)
Members of the Parliament of Finland (1922–24)
Members of the Parliament of Finland (1924–27)
Members of the Parliament of Finland (1927–29)
Members of the Parliament of Finland (1929–30)
Members of the Parliament of Finland (1930–33)